Treasure Hunters is a series of young adult and adventure fiction books written by American author James Patterson with Chris Grabenstein and Mark Shulman. The series has been sold in more than 35 countries, with generally positive and few mixed reviews from critics.

The story revolves around the Kidd siblings: Bick, Beck, Storm and Tommy, who try to find their missing parents who have disappeared. Their father, the legendary treasure hunter Thomas Kidd, went missing during a storm and their mother was kidnapped in Cyprus by pirates three months earlier. The series shows them trying to continue their family occupation―treasure hunting, while fulfilling the demands of the pirates who have kidnapped their mother.

The Kidd family in the series is named after William Kidd, the pirate.

References

Book series introduced in 2013
Young adult novel series
Series of children's books
Collaborative book series